Julia Ann is an American pornographic actress and feature dancer. She is a member of the AVN, XRCO, and Brazzers Halls of Fame.

Career
By age 18 Julia Ann started modeling, then became a professional mud wrestler in Hollywood before becoming one half of the popular touring strip club feature act Blondage, with Janine Lindemulder, in the early 1990s. Their success led to their own issue of the Carnal Comics comic book title (which also published a Julia Ann solo comic, co-written by her), as well as offers to join the pornographic film industry.

Julia Ann debuted in adult films in 1992 in Andrew Blake's Hidden Obsessions, in a lesbian sex scene with Lindemulder. In the 1990s, Ann and Lindemulder performed for Vivid Video. She was under contract to Wicked Pictures in 2006, but in May 2007 she posted on the members section of her website that she had not renewed her contract with Wicked.

Personal life
Ann says she grew up around animals and developed a love for horses; she also took piano lessons and learned to swim "like a fish." At age 12 she moved to Idyllwild, California, where she attended a college-prep school before moving back to Los Angeles to live with her grandmother at age 17.

Awards

AVN awards
 1994 Best All-Girl Sex Scene – Film for Hidden Obsessions
 2000 Best All-Girl Sex Scene – Film for Seven Deadly Sins
 2004 Best Actress – Video for Beautiful
 2004 Hall of Fame
 2010 Best Makeup for The 8th Day
 2010 MILF/Cougar Performer of the Year
 2011 MILF/Cougar Performer of the Year
 2013 MILF/Cougar Performer of the Year
 2015 Hottest MILF (Fan Award)
 2017 Best Marketing Campaign – Individual Project for No on Prop 60
 2017 Mainstream Star of the Year
 2021 Most Outrageous Sex Scene for Ministry of Evil

XRCO awards
 1994 Best Girl-Girl Scene for Hidden Obsessions
 2009 MILF of the Year
 2011 MILF of the Year
 2012 Hall of Fame
 2017 Mainstream Adult Media Favorite

XBIZ awards
 2014 MILF Performer of the Year

NightMoves awards
 2013 Best MILF Performer (Fan's Choice)
 2015 Hall of Fame

Brazzers
2023 Hall of Fame

References

Further reading

External links

 
 
 
 

Year of birth missing (living people)
Actresses from Los Angeles
American female erotic dancers
American erotic dancers
American female adult models
American pornographic film actresses
Living people
Pornographic film actors from California
21st-century American women